Labialithus is a genus of Phrurolithidae spiders, first described by Takahide Kamura in 2021. It contains two species; L. labialis and L. lindemanni, distributed in east Asia.

References 

Phrurolithidae genera
Spiders of Asia
Phrurolithidae